In enzymology, a dihydrobunolol dehydrogenase is an enzyme that catalyzes the chemical reaction

(+/−)-5-[(tert-butylamino)-2'-hydroxypropoxy]-1,2,3,4-tetrahydro-1- naphthol + NADP+  (+/−)-5-[(tert-butylamino)-2'-hydroxypropoxy]-3,4-dihydro-1(2H)- naphthalenone + NADPH + H+

The three substrates of this enzyme are [[(+/−)-5-[(tert-butylamino)-2'-hydroxypropoxy]-1,2,3,4-tetrahydro-1-naphthol]], and NADP+, whereas its 4 products are [[(+/−)-5-[(tert-butylamino)-2'-hydroxypropoxy]-3,4-dihydro-1(2H)-]], naphthalenone, NADPH, and H+.

This enzyme belongs to the family of oxidoreductases, specifically those acting on the CH-OH group of donor with NAD+ or NADP+ as acceptor. The systematic name of this enzyme class is (+/−)-5-[(tert-butylamino)-2'-hydroxypropoxy]-1,2,3,4-tetrahydro-1-n aphthol:NADP+ oxidoreductase. This enzyme is also termed bunolol reductase.

References

 
 

EC 1.1.1
NADPH-dependent enzymes
Enzymes of unknown structure